RX8 may refer to:

 Mazda RX-8, a sports car, made by Mazda
 Roewe RX8, an SUV by Roewe